This is the list of Every shopping malls in Cambodia.

Phnom Penh
 Aeon shopping mall Phnom Penh
 Aeon shopping mall sensok
 Aeon shopping mall Mean chay
 Sorya Shopping Center
 Chip mong noro mall
 Chip mong sensok mall
 FUN mall
 Exchange square
 The Olympia mall

Siem reap
 The heritage walk
 Lucky mall siem reap

Sihanoukville (city)
 The prince mall
 FURI Times Square Mall

Cambodia
Shopping malls